The quality mark "South Tyrol" is a regional collective trademark with geographical indication, that stands for a certified quality in special agricultural products. It guarantees the origin from South Tyrol and a higher quality than the standard requires. Independent and certified authorities check the adherence to the quality requirements.

History
In 1976 the trademark "South Tyrol" was introduced and it was the first seal of quality in Europe. At the beginning it was applied to apples and wine but then it has been extended to other products since then.
In 2005 the brand "Quality Südtirol" was launched. Products with the quality seal guarantee a certified quality from South Tyrol.

The benefits
The mark of quality serves the consumer as a sign. All the products with the South Tyrol quality seal guarantee:
 South Tyrolean origin
 Traditional production methods
 Quality beyond that required by the legal standard
 Compliance with strict quality requirements
 Periodical quality-control checks by certified, independent authorities

Legal framework
The seal of quality meets the strict requirements of EU law and was approved by the European Commission in 2005. It’s ruled by the provincial law Nr. 12/2005. The bearer and owner of the mark of quality is the Autonomous Province of Bolzano.

Controls
The seal "Quality Südtirol" may be used to label only specific agricultural products and food which are compliant with the rules and the strict quality criteria established in the specifications. Producers receive regular visits from independent inspectors, who control the adherence to the specifications and respect of the rules.

Groups of products

Nowadays 16 products, or better, product groups are allowed to use the South Tyrolean mark of quality:
 Apple juice
 Apple strudel
 Beef
 Beer
 Berries
 Bread
 Cherries
 Dried fruit
 Dumplings
 Eggs
 Grappa
 Herbs
 Honey
 Jam
 Milk
 Vegetables

External links
 South Tyrolean Quality Food

References

European Union food law
Symbols introduced in 1976
Certification marks
South Tyrol